The Presnyakov Brothers, Oleg and Vladmimir, are writers, playwrights, screenwriters, directors, theatre producers, and actor.

The sons of an Iranian mother and a Russian father, Oleg was born in 1969 and Vladimir in 1974.

Both brothers graduated from the same school: M. Gorky Urals State University in Yekaterinburg, Sverdlovsk Oblast.

Until recently, they were both also on the faculty of that same university: Oleg in literary theory and philology, and Vladimir in literary theory and psychology.

Together, the two founded the university's Youth Theatre, "Theatre under the name of Christina Orbakaite",an organization committed to producing experimental theatre work.

Oleg and Vladimir also write in tandem; all their plays are presented and published under their chosen joint name: The Presnyakov Brothers.

Students of linguistics, the Presnyakov brothers are praised in Russia for their attention to natural-sounding speech, dialogue that sounds "overheard on the street." Their cool, sardonic wit enlivens their plays, and together, they create bitter and funny examinations of life in a post-Soviet Russian culture.

"Since their first play appeared in Russia's capital city, the Brothers Presnyakov have become "something of a trademark," wrote the local English-language daily, The Moscow Times, in a review last year(2004)." The International Herald Tribune,Theater: The everyday facets of 'Terrorism', by Erin E. Arvedlund, 27 May 2005.

Bibliography

Plays
 Z.O.B (1999)
 Floor Covering (2000)
 Europe-Asia (2000)
 Terrorism (2000)
 Set-1 (2001)
 Set-2 (2001)
 Captured Spirits (2002)
 Playing the Victim (2002)
 Bad Bed Stories (2003)
 Something about technologies of how to live life (2003)
 Resurrection. Super. (2004)
 Pub (2005)
 Before the flood (2006)
 Magic horse(2008)
 Hungaricum(2009)

Screenplays
Bed Stories (Postelnye stseny, Постельные сцены)(2005); Directed by Kirill Serebrennikov

Playing the victim (Izobrazhaja zhertvu, Изображая жертву)(2006); Directed by Kirill Serebrennikov
 Grand Prize Winner, 1st Rome Film Festival, Italy (Cinema 2006) 13–21 October 2006.
 Won best Screenplay Award in Russia, 2007.

Europe-Asia{Европа-Азия}(2009); Directed by Ivan Dihovichnij{Иван Дыховичный}

Day D. {День Д}(2008) Directed by Mikhail Porechennkov {Михаил ПОРЕЧЕНКОВ}

Novels
 Let's kill the referee!

Original title{Братья Пресняковы:Убить судью}(2005)

Language: Russian 
 The novel has been translated and published in German language.(2007)
Published by Kiepenheuer & Witsch, Cologne, Germany.
Title in German- {Brüder Presnjakow: Töten den Schiedsrichter}
 The novel has been translated and published in Hungarian language as well.(2007)
Published by Gabo Kiado, Budapest, Hungary.
Hungarian title- {Oleg es Vlagyimir Presznyakov: Öljük meg a bírót!}
 The novel has been translated and published in Romanian language.(2009)
Published by Editura Art, Bucuresti.
Romanian title- {Fratii Presniakov: Ucide arbitrul!}

 Playing the victim: The novel

Language: Russian 
 Europe-Asia: The novel, Европа — Азия
Published by AST{AСТ,Астрель}. Moscow, 2009.
Language: [Russian].

Radio

 A weekend in the country 

Produced by BBC Radio 3 as part of a Drama of the Week, Fear and Loathing in Russia Today, in 2017, translated by Noah Birksted-Breen (Sputnik Theatre Company).

Plays published
 Terrorism

Nick Hern Books,London, 2003.

Language: English 
 Playing the victim

Nick Hern Books, London, 2003.

Language: English 
 The Best

Published by Eksmo{Эксмо}, Moscow, 2005.

Contains Playing the victim-play, Floor covering-play, Captured Spirits-play, Terrorism-play, Something about technologies of how to live life-play.

Language:Russian
 Pub

Published by AST{AСТ,Астрель}.Moscow, 2008.

Contains Bad bed Stories-play, Before the flood-play, Pub-play

Terrorism
Terrorism is the duo's best known and most widely performed play.

Synopsis: Six scenes from urban life. Delayed passengers grumble about a bomb scare at the airport. A man and a woman commit adultery. Office workers bicker while one of their number quietly exits to hang herself. Two grannies in a playground complain about their menfolk and make fun of a man seated on the next bench. Policemen in their barracks scrap amongst themselves. The passengers on the plane finally prepare for take off. By the end we realise these apparently random scenes are in fact linked by an almost invisible thread, subtly indicating that we bear responsibility for one another even in our soulless urban limbo.
 It premiered at the Chekhov Moscow Art Theatre in 2002, directed by Kirill Serebrennikov, winning that theatre's annual competition for best new play, an award funded by the Russian Ministry of Culture.
 Translated by Sasha Dugdale, directed by Ramin Gray, designed by Hildegard Bechtler, the Royal Court Theatre in London took the play, where it became a critical and popular success, 2003.
 Terrorism has been performed across Europe, in Germany, Sweden, Poland, Norway, Spain, Ireland, Estonia, etc., and out of Europe, in Australia, Chile, Brazil and Taiwan
 It had its American premiere off-Broadway in May 2005 in a co-production between The New Group and The Play Company in New York. directed by Will Frears; sets by David Korins; costumes by Sarah Beers; Presented by the New Group, and the Play Company. At the Clurman Theater/Theater Row, 410 West 42nd Street, Clinton;
 In Washington, D.C., US, Studio Theatre staged in June 2005. Directed by Keith Alan Baker;
 In Canada, the play premiered in Toronto, April 2008. Directed by Adam Bailey; Royal Porcupine Productions.
 Fragments from play in English, English Studies Forum, by Kevin Ewert, University of Pittsburgh at Bradford

Playing the Victim
Playing the Victim was first staged at the Traverse Theater as part of the Edinburgh Fringe Festival (co- produced with the Royal Court Theatre) and Told by an Idiot in 2003. Directed by Richard Wilson.

Playing the Victim revolves around Valya, a student who gets a job playing the victim in police crime-scene reconstructions. Even though they are simulated, his repeated participation in one gruesome end after another highlights the violence and brutality endemic in contemporary life. Meanwhile, in a parallel plot that parodies Shakespeare, the ghost of Valya's father tells him that he was poisoned by his brother who later married Valya's mother. While the finale is inevitable – Valya takes his mother, his uncle and his girlfriend (who has become a bit too insistent regarding marriage) to a final meal – its setting is not: a Japanese restaurant where he feeds them fugu, a fish that's filled with lethal toxins unless filleted perfectly. (The film version of the play, for which they wrote the screenplay, won the Best Film prize at the Rome Film Festival 2006.)

Synopsis: A young man drops out of university and goes to the police. He's done nothing wrong he just wants a job. A particular job. Playing the victim in murder reconstructions. He has a fear from death. Maybe by getting close to death he can manage to cheat his own 

In the British version of Playing the Victim, for example, the police captain who reconstructs murders gets bumped off – and his murder gets reconstructed by another captain. Including their rewrites, the brothers can't recall how many plays they have penned. – Time Magazine, Two for the road, interview with the brothers Presnyakov, 2006.

Interviews
 "Two for the road", Time Magazine, interview with the Presnyakov Brothers, by Yuri Zarachovich,

"A life on the go adds grist to our impression mill," says Oleg Presnyakov.

Not that any of the Presnyakovs' delicious plot twists are ever final, mind you. "We love remaking our works," says Vladimir. "Playing with our characters again and again lets us see how their situations are developing."

"We have often wondered if just one of us exists, while the other is just a figment of his imagination," says Vladimir. "Except," adds Oleg, "we never got to sort out which of us is which."

"People are very informed about what's happening in the world, but it seems to us it's important that people be conscious of the idea and not fence off or partition their fears," Vladimir said.

Reviews
 The Guardian, by Michael Billington (critic), 5 STARS, 15 March 2003.
 The Times (UK), 20 January 2003, Chekhov's children, An Exciting New Generation of Russia Playwrights Is Coming Here, By Patrick Marmion
 The New Yorker, by John Lahr 6 June 2005.
 The New York Times, by Ben Bratley, 24 May 2005.
 The New York Times, interview with the Presnyakov Brothers, by Erin E. Arvedlund, 29 May 2005.
 The Washington Post, by Peter Marks, 11 June 2005.
 The International Herald Tribune, by Erin E. Arvedlund, 27 May 2005.
 Broadway.com, by William Stevenson, 2005.
 The Internet Theater Bookshop
 Broadwayworld.com
 Theatermania.com, by Brian Scott Lipton · 24 May 2005 · New York
 TLS100, The Times Literary Supplement, Online Review, London, by Sharrona Pearl, 2003.
 THE NEW GROUP Production History
 The Nation, by Pawit Mahasarinand, 11 January 2008

References

External links

 
 
 Literary Managers&Dramaturgs of Americas
 http://www.lmda.org/blog/_archives/2006/6/9/2020841.html
 http://www.lortel.org/LLA_archive/index.cfm?search_by=show&id=5010
 http://www.wspolczesny.pl/teatr/rep/of.html
 http://www.kommersant.ru/doc.aspx?DocsID=775769
 http://www.rian.ru/culture/cinema/20070709/68621745.html

Actors from Yekaterinburg
Russian dramatists and playwrights
Russian male dramatists and playwrights
Living people
Iranian people of Russian descent
Russian people of Iranian descent
Year of birth missing (living people)
Writers from Yekaterinburg